Brenthia buthusalis is a species of moth of the family Choreutidae. It was described by Francis Walker in 1863. It is found in Sri Lanka and India.

References

Brenthia
Moths described in 1863
Moths of Asia